Alfred François Donné (13 September 1801 – 7 March 1878) was a French bacteriologist and doctor. He was born in Noyon, France, and died in Paris. Donné was the discoverer of Trichomonas vaginalis. He was also the inventor of the photomicrography.

Léon Foucault was his student and laboratory assistant, and he remained a friend and supporter of Foucault until the latter's death.

References

External links
 
 Who Named It? Alfred Donné
 Alfred Donne, Léon Foucault: Cours de microscopie complémentaire des études médicales ..., Paris, J.B. Baillière, 1845.

1801 births
1878 deaths
People from Noyon
French biologists
Leukemia